Deficiency of the interleukin-1–receptor antagonist (DIRA)  is an autosomal recessive, genetic autoinflammatory syndrome resulting from mutations in IL1RN, the gene encoding the interleukin 1 receptor antagonist. The mutations result in an abnormal protein that is not secreted, exposing the cells to unopposed interleukin 1 activity. This results in sterile multifocal osteomyelitis, periostitis (inflammation of the membrane surrounding the bones), and pustulosis due to skin inflammation from birth.

Symptoms and signs

DIRA displays a constellation of serious symptoms which include respiratory distress, as well as the following:

Cause
Those affected with DIRA have inherited (via autosomal recessive manner) mutations in IL1RN, a gene that encodes a protein known as interleukin 1 receptor antagonist,
The cytogenetic location of IL1RN is 2q14.1, while its 2:113,099,364-113,134,015 are the genomic coordinates.

Mechanism

The mechanism of deficiency of the interleukin-1–receptor antagonist affects the normal function of IL1RN gene. The protein produced by IL1RN gene prevents the normal activities of interleukin 1(alpha) and interleukin 1(beta). Therefore, the pathophysiologic immune and inflammatory responses are nullified.

IL-1RN binds to the same cell receptors as the inflammatory protein IL-1, and blocks its inflammatory actions. Without IL-1Ra, the body cannot control systemic inflammation that can be caused by IL-1.

Diagnosis
Those affected with deficiency of the interleukin-1–receptor antagonist can have diagnosis achieved via noting an increase of erythrocyte sedimentation rate, as well as  the following:
 Genetic test
 Radiological findings
 Clinical findings

Treatment

In terms of treatment a 2013 review indicates that colchicine can be used for DIRA. Additionally there are several other management options such as anakinra, which blocks naturally occurring IL-1.

See also
 Neonatal onset multisystem inflammatory disease (NOMID)

References

Further reading

External links 
 PubMed

Autoinflammatory syndromes
Rare diseases